Hypericum coadunatum is a species of flowering plant of the St. John's wort family (Hypericaceae) that is found in the Canary Islands.

Taxonomy 
The placement of H. coadunatum within Hypericum can be summarized as follows:

Hypericum
 Hypericum subg. Hypericum
 Hypericum sect. Adenosepalum
 subsect. Adenosepalum
 subsect. Aethiopica
 Huber-Morathii group
 subsect. Caprifolia
 H. caprifolium
 H. coadunatum
 H. collenetteae
 H. naudinianum
 H. psilophytum
 H. pubescens
 H. scruglii
 H. sinaicum
 H. somaliense
 H. tomentosum

References 

coadunatum